Khumeh Zar-e Sofla (also Romanized as Khūmeh Zār-e Soflá; also known as Khūmeh Zār) is a former village in Bakesh-e Yek Rural District, in the Central District of Mamasani County, Fars Province, Iran. At the 2006 census, its population was 5,550, in 1,262 families.  It is now part of the city of Khumeh Zar.

References 

Former populated places in Fars Province